The International Monument to the Victims of Fascism (lit. International Monument to the Victims of the Camp) is a commemorative monument in the Auschwitz II–Birkenau concentration camp in Birkenau (now Brzezinka) in southern Poland. It lies at the western end of the railway lines which cross the camp from the main gate. The monument was designed by Italian architects  and Pietro Cascella, and executed in collaboration with Polish and Italian artists Jerzy Jarnuszkiewicz,  and Giorgio Simoncini. Completion of the monument took about nine years. It was dedicated on 16 April 1967. Trees were planted behind the monument by the people of Brzezinka.

History 

Selection of the design of the monument was made through an international competition, which was conducted in two phases. The first phase was organised by the International Auschwitz Committee with the participation of the International Union of Architects, and was announced on 2 June 1956. The British sculptor Henry Moore was chairman of the selection committee. A total of 465 design proposals were received, from almost 700 architects and artists from 36 different countries.

References 

Auschwitz concentration camp
Holocaust memorials in Poland
1967 establishments in Poland
1967 sculptures